Um Mil  is a Syrian village located in Barri Sharqi Subdistrict in Salamiyah District, Hama.  According to the Syria Central Bureau of Statistics (CBS), Um Mil had a population of 118 in the 2004 census.

References 

Populated places in Salamiyah District